Tyler Martins, also known as Marss, is an American professional Super Smash Bros. player. In Super Smash Bros. for Wii U he won several minor tournaments but failed to take any of the premier-events, and was ranked as the 16th best player of all time in the game. In Super Smash Bros. Ultimate he has fared considerably better, winning several premier tournaments and claiming 3rd and 5th in the rankings for the first and second half of 2019, respectively.

Marss has primarily used Zero Suit Samus in all three games in the Super Smash Bros franchise that he has competed in. As of Smash Ultimate, he is considered the best Zero Suit Samus player in the world, and has been noted for his aggressive style that capitalizes on the character's superior mobility.

Career

Early career and Super Smash Bros. for Wii U

Marss began competing in Smash with Super Smash Bros. Brawl. In 2013, he took 9th place at a minor tournament, Mega Mass Madness 5. He used Zero Suit Samus at the event.

After Super Smash Bros. for Wii U released in late 2014, Marss quickly rose to prominence. He claimed the top spot in the regional rankings for his home region of New England, and alongside his brother, who played with the handle "Pugwest", also dominated the region's 2v2 competition. His first significant result in a Smash competition came in December 2015, when he took second at the regional KTAR XV tournament, defeating several top players before losing to Nairoby "Nairo" Quezada in the finals. The next month, he tied for 7th at Genesis 3, before taking 3rd place at Pound 2016 in April. As a result of his strong showing in early Smash for Wii U events, Marss was ranked the 13th best player by the inaugural Panda Global Rankings.

While Marss was able to attend more major tournaments in the second half of the year than the first, Pound 2016 was his highest placing at a premier tournament that year. He tied for 7th at The Big House 6, 9th at Evo 2016, Super Smash Con 2016, and UGC Smash Open, and 25th at CEO 2016. He did, however, claim another second-place finish at a mid-tier tournament, 2GGT: KTAR Saga. With these results, he fell two places to 15th in the second edition of the Panda Global Rankings, which covered the latter half of the year. In August 2016, shortly after his 9th-place finish at Evo 2016, Marss was signed by multi-esport organization Denial eSports.

For the remainder of Marss' Smash for Wii U career, he would be unable to meet or beat his 13th place spot in the inaugural rankings. 2017 started out strong, with a 5th-place finish at 2GGC Civil War and 7th-place finishes at both CEO 2017 and CEO Dreamland, but after parting with Denial eSports in June, he did not attend most of the major tournaments held in the second half of the year. His best result of the year was 2nd at The Big House 7 in August, which saw him defeat Gonzalo "ZeRo" Barrios, the best Smash for Wii U player in the world, before losing to Samuel "Dabuz" Buzby in the finals. He also tied for 13th at Shine 2017, tied for 17th at GameTyrant Expo 2017, and tied for 25th at 2GGC: MKLeo Saga. He rose one position to 14th, then fell down to 19th, in the Panda Global Rankings for the first and second halves of 2017, respectively.

In 2018, Marss only appeared in three of the year's nine biggest tournaments, tying for 9th at CEO 2018, 17th at Frostbite 2018, and 49th at 2GG: Hyrule Saga. He also won two minor tournaments, Immortal Tech 2018 and Midwest Mayhem 12.8:36 With his absence from many events and his low placing at 2GG: Hyrule Saga, Marss dropped to 25th in the final bi-annual Panda Global Rankings for Smash for Wii U. Panda would later release a special list of the top 100 Smash for Wii U players of all time, and Marss was ranked 16th.

Marss primarily used Zero Suit Samus in tournaments. His secondary characters were Lucario and Captain Falcon.

Super Smash Bros. Ultimate

Super Smash Bros. Ultimate was released in December 2018. In the first months of Smash Ultimate competition, Marss placed highly in several major tournaments and won several smaller events. After weak showings three of the major events held – placing 17th in one and 25th in the other two – Marss went on a streak of top-four finishes. In March, Marss was signed to Panda. He immediately went on to win the minor tournament Full Bloom 5, also winning its 2v2 event alongside fellow Panda player Brian "Cosmos" Kalu. He took 3rd in Pound 2019 in April, 2nd at Get On My Level 2019 and 3rd at MomoCon 2019 in May,  and 4th at Smash 'N' Splash 5 and 2nd at CEO 2019 in June. In the inaugural Panda Global Rankings Ultimate, Marss was ranked 3rd, behind only Leonardo "MkLeo" López Pérez and Gavin "Tweek" Dempsey, the players that defeated him in the finals of CEO 2019 and Get On My Level 2019 respectively.

In the second half of 2019, Marss continued to perform well. In July he traveled to Cholula, Puebla, Mexico and won Smash Factor 8, defeating MkLeo. In August he tied for 13th at Evo 2019, the largest offline tournament by number of entrants in the Smash Bros. franchise's history. Later that month he took 4th at two other major tournaments, Super Smash Con 2019 and Shine 2019. In September he won DreamHack Montreal 2019, took 3rd at Mainstage 2019, and tied for 7th at SwitchFest 2019. He would round out the year with a tie for 9th at the Smash Ultimate Summit 2 invitational tournament in October, and a win at Dreamhack Atlanta in November. Despite his wins at the two DreamHack events and strong showings at other tournaments, Marss fell to 5th in the Panda Global Rankings for the second half of the year.

In the first major tournament of 2020, Lets Make Big Moves, Marss tied for 5th. At the end of January he won Genesis 7, defeating MkLeo and denying the latter a fourth consecutive Genesis win. However at the next tournament, February's Frostbite 2020, Marss finished tied for 17th. Frostbite was the last major tournament held before Panda Global Rankings suspended the 2020 competitive season due to the COVID-19 pandemic. While CEO 2020 no longer counted towards the rankings, the event still took place, though with a significant number of player cancellations. Marss took 4th in the event.

As in previous editions of Smash, Marss primarily uses Zero Suit Samus in competition. In the first months of the game's release, he used Captain Falcon, Ike, and Mega Man as secondaries, though by the end of 2019 he had dropped Captain Falcon and Ike.

Zero Suit Samus

Marss is considered the best Zero Suit Samus player in the world. In a 2019 interview, Marss stated that he picked her because "she just looked cool". He is known for his aggressive and flashy style of play,3:03 utilizing the character's high speed and mobility to make up for her weak attacks.2:33 Though Smash players typically prefer staying in the center of the stage, Marss often fights on the edges, using Zero Suit Samus's mobility to knock away his opponent while safely recovering himself. He is also willing to "trade stocks" – sacrifice one of his lives to ensure that he takes one from his opponent – a technique few players are willing to use as consistently as Marss does.

Personal life

Marss was born in Rhode Island, United States.  He is known for wearing pajama pants during competition.

References

External links
 
 
 

Super Smash Bros. for Wii U players
People from Rhode Island
1998 births
American esports players
Living people
Super Smash Bros. Ultimate players